Drucat is a commune in the Somme department in Hauts-de-France in northern France.

Geography

Population

History
There was a station on the Réseau des Bains de Mer, called Plessiel-Drucat, which opened on 19 June 1892 and closed on 10 March 1947.

Places of interest
Saint Martin's church.
The recently restored chapel.
Plessiel water-tower

Personalities
The composer Jean-François Lesueur (1760–1837) was born at Plessiel, a hamlet within the commune of Drucat. The village hall is named in his honour.

See also
Communes of the Somme department
Réseau des Bains de Mer

References

Communes of Somme (department)